Wood Wharf is a 23 acre site in Canary Wharf, London. It is currently under construction to provide offices, residential homes and retail space. The site is next to Canary Wharf. Wood Wharf will contain 5 million square feet of space, which will include 2 million sq ft of office space, 3,330 residential homes, 3.6 hectares (8.9 acres) of public spaces, and 380,000 sq ft of shops, restaurants and space for community use.  It is estimated to be completed in 2023.

The architects for the site include Allies and Morrison, Darling Associates, KPF, Herzog & de Meuron, Pilbrow & Partners, Stanton Williams Architects, Grid Architects, and Patel Taylor. The masterplan has been designed by Allies and Morrison Architects.

Site history
The Wood Wharf Business Park was sold by British Waterways to a joint partnership in the financial year 2007–08.

The Canal & River Trust is the freeholder of the main  site following the transfer of all the assets of British Waterways in 2012. British Waterways had previously acquired the site from the Port of London. Canary Wharf Group plc purchased a 250-year lease for the site in January 2012.

First masterplan
In 2003, British Waterways issued a masterplan for a substantial, mixed used redevelopment of the site. The masterplan has been adopted by Tower Hamlets as interim guidance to support the current local plan.

Development 
During 2004, British Waterways held a competition to select a development partner for the project. In 2005, a consortium of British Waterways, Canary Wharf Group and Ballymore Properties established the Wood Wharf Partnership to develop the scheme with Berwin Leighton Paisner as legal advisors.

In November 2007, a new master plan was unveiled, by Rogers Stirk Harbour + Partners. Outline planning was submitted to Tower Hamlets in July 2008 and were approved in October 2008. The official Wood Wharf website was updated. The new master plan shows considerably higher density, as well as more towers, which are also taller than the previous ones. The next step is to find different architects to design each individual building. The developers want at least one iconic residential, and one iconic office tower as part of the project.

The new master plan also contains a high street, which will run up the middle of the site. This will host bars, shops, cafés and restaurants. This will be covered by a glass snake-skin type roof. A planning application was filed on 30 June 2008. On 8 October 2008, Tower Hamlets Strategic Development Committee voted unanimously to grant approval for the application.

Canary Wharf Group, which is a 25% partner in Wood Wharf project, does not wish to proceed with the scheme until it has completed and let all of the office projects on and around the original Canary Wharf Estate, including Riverside South, North Quay, Heron Quays West, and 25 Bank Street.

In January 2012, Canary Wharf Group took 100% control of the project by paying British Waterways £52.5m for their 50% stake and Ballymore £38m for their 25% stake. Under the agreement Canary Wharf Group has been a granted a new 250-year lease from British Waterways with ground rent payable which will grow to £6m per annum.

In September 2012, Terry Farrell was appointed to replace Rogers Stirk Harbour + Partners in leading the development of the masterplanning.

Second masterplan
In January 2013, Herzog & de Meuron, Allies and Morrison and Stanton Williams were appointed as architects for various elements of the scheme.

In December 2013, a new masterplan was submitted to Tower Hamlets by Canary Wharf Group, which placed greater emphases on residential uses compared to the previous plans.

Approval
In July 2014, Tower Hamlets council granted planning permission to construct 30 buildings, comprising 4.9m square feet of homes, offices and shops (planning reference PA/13/02966). Work on the Wood Wharf site is expected to start in autumn 2014, with the first buildings occupied at the end of 2018.

In December 2014, it was announced that Boris Johnson had approved the scheme to include "around 25% of the new homes created in the scheme will be affordable homes whilst a review mechanism has been agreed to increase this allocation to around 40% affordable housing".

Buildings
 One Park Drive

See also
Jamestown Harbour

References

External links
 
 

Canary Wharf buildings
Redevelopment projects in London
Buildings and structures in the London Borough of Tower Hamlets